Karo may refer to:

Ethnic groups
 Karo people (East Africa), a group of tribes in East Africa
 Karo people (Ethiopia), an ethnic group from Ethiopia
 Karo people (Indonesia), the indigenous people of the Karo Plateau in North Sumatra

Languages
 Karo language (Brazil), a Tupian language
 Karo language (Ethiopia), an Omotic language
 Karo language (Nilotic), a Nilotic language of Uganda, South Sudan and the DRC
 Karo language (Indonesia), an Austronesian language of Sumatra, Indonesia
 The Kalo dialect of the Austronesian Keapara language of Papua New Guinea
 The Karo dialect of the Papuan Rawa language of Papua New Guinea

People
 Karo (name), a list of people with the given name or surname

Other uses
 Karo Regency, a regency of North Sumatra, Indonesia
 KARO (98.7 FM) a radio station of Oregon, the United States
 Karō, samurai officials and advisers of feudal Japan
 Karo-kari (honor killings against men is Karo)
Karo syrup, a US brand of corn syrup
 Karo (tree), small tree or shrub native to New Zealand, aka Pittosporum crassifolium
 United States v. Karo, 468 U.S. 705 (1984), a Supreme Court decision related to the Fourth Amendment's protections against unreasonable search and seizure
 Karo (film), a 1937 Armenian-language Soviet adventure-war film
 Protagonist of My Queen Karo, a 2009 Belgian film
 Karo (cigarette), a German brand of filterless cigarettes
 Eucalyptus brassiana, known as the Karo tree in Papua New Guinea

See also 
 Caro (disambiguation)
Garo (disambiguation)
Karos (disambiguation)
 

Language and nationality disambiguation pages